Atwima-Kwanwoma is one of the constituencies represented in the Parliament of Ghana. It elects one Member of Parliament (MP) by the first past the post system of election. Atwima-Kwanwoma is located in the Botsomtwe/Atwima/Kwanhuma district  of the Ashanti Region of Ghana.

Boundaries
The seat is located within the Botsomtwe/Atwima/Kwanhuma District of the Ashanti Region of Ghana.

Members of Parliament

Elections

See also
List of Ghana Parliament constituencies

References 

Parliamentary constituencies in the Ashanti Region